Hardin Springs is an unincorporated community in Hardin County, Kentucky, United States. Hardin Springs is also home to the Hardin Springs School, a building which is on the National Register of Historic Places.

References

Unincorporated communities in Hardin County, Kentucky
Unincorporated communities in Kentucky